Anthony "Tony" Arnull is a British legal scholar specialising in EU law and holds the Barber Chair of Jurisprudence at the University of Birmingham's Law School.

Early life and education 
He later then went on to qualify as a Solicitor of the Senior Courts of England and Wales within a Magic Circle law firm. He then went on to study at the University of Leicester for his PhD.

Career and research

1990 
Arnull wrote The General Principles of EEC Law and the Individual in 1990, assessing the impact of the European Court of Justice. In a review, Lewis outlined:

 "It must also be said that the discussion is certainly thorough and scholarly and Arnull makes thought-provoking observations on the case law."

2003 
Arnull provided a memorandum to the UK's House of Lords after being asked to comment on the new roles the European Court of Justice would play in the Treaty of Nice

2010 
Arnull contributed to Channel 4's FactCheck on the Lord Pearson's claim: "Most of our national law is now made in Brussels" on Sky (6 April 2010)

2017 
In 2017, Arnull published European Union law: a very short introduction, a book aimed at the general public to introduce the laws of the European Union, within the popular a very short introduction book series from Oxford University Press.

Editor 
Arnull is a consultant editor on the European Law Journal

Publications

Books 

 European Union Law: A Very Short Introduction (2017)
The European Union and its Court of Justice (2006)
The General Principles of EEC Law and the Individual (1990).  
The Oxford Handbook of European Union Law (2015).

References  

Living people
English solicitors
Academics of the University of Birmingham
European Union
University of Sussex
Alumni of the University of Leicester
Year of birth missing (living people)